The Jester Calabacillas may refer to:
 The Jester Calabacillas (Madrid), a portrait by Velázquez of Don Juan Martín Martín, in the Prado Museum
 The Jester Calabacillas (Cleveland), a 1626-1632 painting by Diego Velázquez, in the Cleveland Museum of Art